Every Beat of My Heart is the fourteenth studio album by Rod Stewart released in 1986 by Warner Bros. Records. The tracks were recorded at One on One Studios, Can Am Recorders, Cherokee Studios, The Village Recorder, The Record Plant, and Artisan Sound Recorders. The album produced four singles: "Love Touch", "Another Heartache", "In My Life", and "Every Beat of My Heart." In the United States, the album was released under the eponymous title of Rod Stewart.

Content
Included on this album is the song "Love Touch", which gained popularity as the theme to the Robert Redford film Legal Eagles. "Love Touch" was written by Holly Knight, Mike Chapman, and Gene Black. The album also includes a cover of Lennon–McCartney's "In My Life", one of several times Rod covered them.  It was released as a single which failed to chart. According to the liner notes, this album is dedicated to Rod's parents Bob and Elsie Stewart. "Every Beat Of My Heart" was the biggest hit of the album and reached number two in the UK Singles Chart in July 1986.

Cash Box said of the title track that it's "a rock ballad that shimmers with solid production values and the singer’s trademark grainy voice."  Billboard called it a "emotional ballad about belonging, delivered with believability."

Track listing
"Here to Eternity" (Rod Stewart, Kevin Savigar) – 5:58
"Another Heartache" (Bryan Adams, Jim Vallance, Stewart, Randy Wayne) – 4:29
"A Night Like This" (Stewart) – 4:06
"Who's Gonna Take Me Home" (Stewart, Savigar, Jay Davis) – 4:38
"Red Hot in Black" (Stewart, Jim Cregan, Kevin Savigar) – 3:30
"Love Touch" (Mike Chapman, Gene Black, Holly Knight) – 3:59
"In My Own Crazy Way" (Stewart, Frankie Miller, Troy Seals, Eddie Setser) – 3:17
"Every Beat of My Heart" (Stewart, Kevin Savigar) – 5:18
"Ten Days of Rain" (Stewart, Savigar, Tony Brock) – 5:21
"In My Life" (John Lennon, Paul McCartney) – 2:00

Personnel 

 Rod Stewart – lead vocals
 Kevin Savigar – keyboards
 Nicky Hopkins – keyboards
 Bob Ezrin – keyboards, backing vocals
 Randy Wayne – keyboards
 Paul Fox – keyboards
 Jim Cregan – guitar, backing vocals
 Robin Le Mesurier – guitar
 Robert Athis (Kane Roberts) – guitar
 John Corey – guitar, electric sitar
 Gene Black – guitar
 Steve Cropper – guitar
 Nils Lofgren – guitar
 David Williams – guitar
 Jay Davis – bass guitar
 Patrick O'Hearn – bass guitar
 Scott Edwards – bass guitar
 Tony Brock – drums
 Tom Scott – brass, reeds
 Larry Williams and Co. – brass, reeds
 Devon Dickinson – bagpipes
 Harry Farrar – bagpipes
 Kevin Weed – bagpipes
 Tray Galaway, Phil Perry, Kevin Dorsey, Daryl Phinnesse, Oren Waters – The Singers
 Albert Hammond, Joe Turano, Holly Knight, Mike Chapman, Darlene Koldenhoven, Clydene Edwards, Carmen Twillie, Jennifer Repo, Jeoffrey Repo, John Batdorf – backing vocals

Production
 Producers – Bob Ezrin (Tracks 1-5 & 7-10); Michael Chapman (Track 6).
 Production Coordinator on Tracks 1-5 & 7-10 – Malcolm Cullimore 
 Engineers – Paul Lani (Tracks 1-5 & 7-10); George Tutko (Track 6).
 Additional Recording on Tracks 1-5 & 7-10 – Jeff Bennette, Brian Christian, Peter Lewis and David Tickle.
 Remixing – Bob Ezrin and David Tickle (Tracks 1-5 & 7-10); George Tutko (Track 6).
 Assistant Remixing on Tracks 1-5 & 7-10 – David Ahlert, Jim Dineen, Craig Engle, Stan Katayama and Bob Loftus.
 Technical Director on Tracks 1-5 & 7-10 – Robert Hrycyna
 Mastered by Doug Sax at The Mastering Lab (Los Angeles, CA).
 Art Direction – Jeff Ayeroff and Jeri McManus
 Design – Jeri McManus
 Photography – Phillip Dixon
 Management – Randy Phillips and Arnold Stiefel

Charts

Weekly charts

Year-end charts

Certifications

References

External links 
About.com 

Rod Stewart albums
1986 albums
Albums produced by Bob Ezrin
Warner Records albums